Johnnie David Williamson lll (born March 24, 1979) is an American singer, songwriter and multi-instrumentalist. He is known by the stage name, Davy Williamson. Prior to his current project he was the lead singer of the North Carolina modern rock musical band, Third Class Passenger.

Born in Plant City, Florida and raised in his hometown, Wilmington, North Carolina, Davy Williamson began his musical career in 1996 when he joined the Indy Rock band, Emilio 5. He left the group later that year. In 1998, he co-founded a Modern rock band, Third Class Passenger, in North Carolina. In 2003, the band recorded their debut unsigned album, Dislabelled, with recording and mixing engineer Steve Hardy.

In 2004, he left Third Class Passenger and joined a Punk rock band, Ma-shot-pa but left in 2006.

He has since performed as a solo act under the stage name, Davy Williamson.

Early life 
Davy Williamson was born in Plant City, Florida on March 24, 1979 to Johnny David Williamson, a musician who also served in the US Army and the US Air Force, and Debbie Kay Harkins, a nurse. After his parent divorced, his mother married Terry Harkins in 1987. In 2010, His father passed away, survived by Davy and his brother, Steven Daniel Williamson. From his mother’s second marriage, he also has a half-brother, Lennon Harkins, and a half-sister, Melissa Marie Harkins.

Growing up in Wilmington, North Carolina, he was deeply inspired by his father, a Bass player who was particularly influenced by the Southern rock, Country music and Hard rock. His mother loves Motown, Beach music, and Pop music, and this reflected on him as well. At the age of 13, he started playing the Guitar, but soon started playing other instruments as well, including Drums and Bass guitar.

Due to his growing up around such diverse and usually conflicting family influence musically, it took him a long time to narrow down and define what his true sound was. His first tape was Sérgio Mendes’ Never Gonna Let You Go (Sérgio Mendes song). Every day, He and his brother, Steven, took a wild musical ride, bringing something different they had figured out how to play, be it a song by The Beatles, Propagandhi, Metallica, James Taylor, STP, Nirvana, and the likes. His brother, Steve, is now a musician as well. He sings, plays guitar, and plays bass as well.

He attended E.A. Laney High School where he started his first indy band, Emilio 5, in 1996. He was also in Jazz ensemble in high school and was recognized as an advanced Guitar player in his early years with them.

The summer before he turned 16, he went to stay with his father in Olympia, Washington. There, he had the chance to visit Aberdeen, Washington (Home of Kurt Cobain). This was during the Grunge Music boom. It was there that he fueled his desire for playing music.

Third Class Passenger 
In 1998, he co-founded a modern rock band, Third Class Passenger, in North Carolina. The founding members were Davy Williamson himself (Guitar, Lead Vocals), Jason Gurganus (Drums), and Chris McCullen (Bass, Backup Vocals). While with Third Class Passenger, he was under the sponsorship of Jägermeister, who promoted their national touring efforts. They were also on the Zippo hot tour, as well as other small level sponsorships during touring times.

In 2003, the band finally decided to take the next step when they met in New York to record their debut unsigned album, Dislabelled, tracked and produced at Sound on Sound Studios, Manhattan, New York, with recording and Mixing engineer Steve Hardy. From there, the record was mixed in Unique Studios, located in Times Square, before being mastered by Andy VanDette at Masterdisk Studios, New York City. He left Third Class Passenger in 2004.

Ma-Shot-Pa 
In 2005, he joined Ma-shot-pa, where he was the songwriter and guitarist. Ma-shot-pa shared the stage with many artistes such as The Misfits, Less Than Jake, Mustard Plug, Rehab, and Valient Thorr. He left Ma-shot-pa in 2006.

Solo career 
After leaving Ma-shot-pa, he decided to quit band act, go solo and start singing on his own. Most recently, he has been living and performing in the Virgin Islands, playing mostly as a solo act. He also plays as a duo act with artists like John Hodges (Smoking Okra) and Andy Easton (The Tin Roof) in Atlanta, Georgia. This has spanned a five-year period.

Recently Davy has been seen sharing the stage with the likes of better known artist such as Toryn Green of (Fuel), and Paul Phillips of (Puddle of Mudd).

As for now Davy has been working on a brand new EP. The EP in the making is set to be released in early November.
His Debut Single "Thin Disguise" is out now on all streaming services.

Personal life 
Davy has a daughter, Caelyn Paige Williamson.

References

1979 births
Living people
People from Plant City, Florida
People from Wilmington, North Carolina